Daniel Paul Burton (born December 4, 1963) is an American bicycle enthusiast from Eagle Mountain, Utah, and the first person to complete an expedition from the coast of Antarctica to the South Pole by bicycle (though not the first to cycle to it).

Burton began his expedition, "The South Pole Epic", on December 2, 2013, at Hercules Inlet and arrived at the South Pole on January 21, 2014.

Background 
Burton was a computer programmer by trade. Twenty-three years into his career and out of shape in his 40s, Burton went to get his blood checked. His cholesterol levels were poor, his blood pressure was high and he was a bit overweight. He started to mountain bike and in 2008 established a bike shop in Saratoga Springs, Utah, called Epic Biking. He finished the LOTOJA Classic six times and wanted to do more. He decided to set out on his Antarctic ride to inspire people and to encourage donations to the American Diabetes Association. He also wanted to ride in honor of his mother, whose high cholesterol contributed to her death on November 30, 2012.

South Pole 
Burton began riding fatbikes, which are fortified bikes with wide tires that are intended for sand, ice and snow. He became interested in Eric Larsen's attempt to travel to the bottom of the world in 2012. Larsen made it a quarter of the way before turning around. Training for a year, Burton set off on his expedition December 2, 2013. He started at Hercules Inlet and rode  on a Borealis Yampa fatbike until he reached the Geographic South Pole.

See also 
List of Antarctic cycling expeditions

References

External links 
 South Pole Epic Blog
 Official Page, Everyday Epic
 TEDx talk at Hill AFB, 2014
 Story Untold podcast interview, 2019

1963 births
Living people
American explorers
American motivational speakers
Sportspeople from Corvallis, Oregon
Explorers of Antarctica
American male cyclists
People from Eagle Mountain, Utah
People from Saratoga Springs, Utah